Kadir Keleş (born 1 January 1988) is a Turkish footballer who plays as a midfielder for TFF Second League club Kastamonuspor 1966.

Professional career
On 10 May 2018, Kadir helped Akhisar Belediyespor win their first professional trophy, the 2017–18 Turkish Cup.

Honours
Akhisarspor
 Turkish Cup (1): 2017-18
 Turkish Super Cup: 2018

Club statistics

Club

References

External links
 
 

1988 births
Sportspeople from Trabzon
Living people
Turkish footballers
Turkey youth international footballers
Association football midfielders
Trabzonspor footballers
Gaziantep F.K. footballers
1461 Trabzon footballers
Diyarbakırspor footballers
Adana Demirspor footballers
Akhisarspor footballers
Adanaspor footballers
Süper Lig players
TFF First League players
TFF Second League players